The El Parque de la Gran Colombia (Spanish for Greater Colombia Park or Park of the Greater Colombia) is an historical and tourist complex located in the locality of Villa del Rosario (Cúcuta). It is in the 6th km of International Highway to Venezuela. The park houses:
 The House of Santander, where the hero of the independence Francisco de Paula Santander lived his first 13 years;
 The historic church of Cúcuta, where the Congress of Cúcuta was established and where the Colombian Constitution of 1821 was written;
 The House of the Bagatela, which served as base for the Executive Power in 1821;
 The tamarind tree under which the editors of the constitution of the New Granada (then Colombia and Panama) and patriots from Venezuela rested after the meetings.

References
 Ministry of Culture - House of Santander
 Gobernación de Norte de Santander - House of Santander
 House of the Bagatela

Cúcuta
Geography of Norte de Santander Department
Francisco de Paula Santander
Independence of Colombia
Independence of Venezuela
Tourist attractions in Norte de Santander Department
Parks in Colombia